The Isaurian Decapolis was a group of ten cities in ancient and medieval Isauria. According to the De Thematibus of the 10th-century Byzantine emperor Constantine VII Porphyrogennetos, the Decapolis comprised the inland portions of Isauria, with the cities of Germanicopolis, Titiopolis, Dometiopolis, Zenopolis, Neapolis, Claudiopolis, Irenopolis, Diocaesarea, Lauzadus and Dalisandus.

References

Isauria
Historical regions in Turkey